Stuttfloget Cliff is a steep rock cliff forming the southwest end of Mount Grytoyr in the Muhlig-Hofmann Mountains, Queen Maud Land. Mapped by Norwegian cartographers from surveys and air photos by the Norwegian Antarctic Expedition (1956–60) and named Stuttfloget (the short rock wall).

References

Cliffs of Queen Maud Land
Princess Martha Coast